Epascestria is a genus of moths of the family Crambidae.

Species
Epascestria croesusalis (Hampson, 1913)
Epascestria distictalis (Hampson, 1913)
Epascestria euprepialis (Hampson, 1913)
Epascestria pictalis (Hampson, 1913)
Epascestria pustulalis (Hübner, 1823)

Former species
Epascestria microdontalis (Hampson, 1913)

References

Odontiini
Crambidae genera
Taxa named by Jacob Hübner